Events in the year 1965 in Cyprus.

Incumbents 

 President: Makarios III
 President of the Parliament: Glafcos Clerides

Events 

 19 March – U.N. Security Council Resolution 201 was adopted unanimously. In it, the Council extended the stationing of the United Nations Peacekeeping Force in Cyprus for another 3 months, to end on June 26, 1965.

Deaths

References 

 
1960s in Cyprus
Years of the 21st century in Cyprus
Cyprus
Cyprus
Cyprus